Josephinum means house of Joseph and may refer to various buildings and institutions including:

Josephinum Academy, a private all-girls school in Chicago, Illinois
Josephinian Military Academy of Surgery in Vienna, 1784–1874
Josephinum Medical Museum, home to a collection of anatomical wax models in Vienna, Austria
Pontifical College Josephinum a liberal arts college in Columbus, Ohio